Stress tensor may refer to:

 Cauchy stress tensor, in classical physics
 Stress deviator tensor, in classical physics
 Piola–Kirchhoff stress tensor, in continuum mechanics
 Viscous stress tensor, in continuum mechanics
 Stress–energy tensor, in relativistic theories
 Maxwell stress tensor, in electromagnetism
 Electromagnetic stress–energy tensor, in relativistic physics

See also
Stress (disambiguation)
Tensor (disambiguation)
Stress measures

Science disambiguation pages